Mirimli is a village and municipality in Yardymli Rayon, Azerbaijan.  It has a population of 1,200.  The municipality consists of the villages of Mirimli and Şələ.

References 

Populated places in Yardimli District